The murder of Annie Le occurred on September 8, 2009, while she was working in the New Haven, Connecticut campus of Yale University. Annie Marie Thu Le (July 3, 1985 – September 8, 2009) was a 24-year-old doctoral student at the Yale School of Medicine's Department of Pharmacology. She was last seen in a research building on the New Haven campus on September 8. On September 13, the day that she was to be married, she was found dead inside the building.

On September 17, police arrested the perpetrator, Raymond J. Clark III, a Yale laboratory technician who worked in the building. Clark pleaded guilty to the murder on March 17, 2011. Clark was sentenced to 44 years imprisonment on June 3. The case generated frenetic media coverage.

Disappearance and death 

On the morning of September 8, Le left her apartment and took Yale Transit to the Sterling Hall of Medicine on the Yale campus. At about 10 a.m., she walked from Sterling Hall to another campus building at 10 Amistad Street, where her research laboratory was located. Le had left her purse, cell phone, credit cards, and cash in her office at Sterling Hall. She entered the Amistad Street building just after 10 a.m., as documented on footage from the building's security cameras. Le was never seen leaving the building. At approximately 9 p.m. on the evening of September 8, when Le had still not returned to her home, one of her five housemates called police to report her missing.

Because the security footage did not show Le exiting the building at Amistad Street, police closed the whole building for investigation. Police also searched through refuse at the Hartford dump, where Yale's garbage is incinerated, looking for clues as to Le's whereabouts. The FBI, the New Haven Police Department and the Connecticut State Police were all involved in the search.

On Sunday, September 13, her planned wedding date, authorities discovered Le's body in a cable chase inside the wall of a basement laboratory in the Amistad Street building. Bloody clothes had previously been found above a ceiling tile in the same building, which is monitored by about 75 security cameras. The entrance and the rooms inside the building require Yale identification cards to be opened and accessed. The basement where Le's body was found houses animals that are used for experiments and research. Due to the high security measures in the building, authorities and Yale officials maintained that it would be extremely difficult for someone without a Yale ID card to enter the basement laboratory, leading them to focus their investigation on Yale employees and students.

The Connecticut medical examiner's autopsy found that Le's death was a result of "traumatic asphyxia due to neck compression". On September 17 police arrested Raymond Clark, a 24-year-old laboratory technician who had been working in the same building. The previous day he was taken into custody after police obtained a warrant to collect his DNA; he was released after providing a sample.

Memorials were held in California and Huntington, New York, and the funeral was broadcast live on the Internet. The Yale community also publicly mourned Le's death. The Yale Daily News reported that professor and Cold War historian John Lewis Gaddis called September 14 the "saddest day to open class" since the day after the 9/11 attacks.

Personal life 

Le was born in San Jose, California to a Vietnamese-American family. She spent her childhood with her aunt and uncle. She was valedictorian of her graduating class at Union Mine High School in El Dorado, California, and voted "most likely to be the next Einstein". After earning approximately $160,000 in scholarship money, she attended and graduated from the University of Rochester in New York. Her major was cell developmental biology with a minor in medical anthropology.

Le was accepted into a graduate program at Yale that would have led to her earning a doctorate in pharmacology. Her research had applications in the treatment of diabetes and certain forms of cancer. She was due to be married on September 13, 2009, in Syosset, New York to Jonathan Widawsky, a graduate student in applied physics and mathematics at Columbia University.

She had previously written an article for Yale Medical School's B Magazine titled "Crime and Safety in New Haven", published in February 2009.

Media coverage 

The case of Annie Le generated frenetic media coverage, with a news producer trampled in a rush to a briefing. In the wake of her disappearance and murder, there was a backlash in some circles to the extensive media coverage and while most acknowledged the crime was especially heartbreaking, some questioned whether the level of interest was warranted.

Some commentators have suggested that the attention given by the media was inappropriately disproportionate to that given to other murder victims. Slate contributor Jack Shafer opined that "Journalists almost everywhere observe this rough rule of thumb: Three murders at a Midwestern college equal one murder at Harvard or Yale." Connecticut Post columnist MariAn Gail Brown argued that there is a "pecking order in the investigation of crimes, and that Le's murder attracted media attention because she was an Ivy Leaguer", someone who might earn beaucoup bucks, someone who possesses sky's-the-limit potential, vivacious and attractive, too".

Prosecution 

After his arrest, Clark was held on $3 million bail at the MacDougall-Walker Correctional Institution, a maximum-security prison in Suffield, Connecticut. He appeared in Connecticut Superior Court on October 6, 2009 but did not then enter a plea to the charges. His hearing was delayed until January 26, 2010 since not all of the materials in the case had been made available to the lawyers. Clark initially pleaded not guilty on January 26. His pretrial hearing was scheduled for March 3, 2010 in New Haven with pretrial evidence processing scheduled for July 26. In October 2010, Clark's case was continued and another hearing was scheduled for February 9, 2011. In March 2011, Clark entered a guilty plea in Le's murder in exchange for a 44-year prison term. On an additional charge of an attempted sexual assault of Le, he entered an Alford plea, a guilty plea that does not admit the facts but concedes the sufficiency of the evidence against him. Clark officially entered the pleas on March 17 and he was formally sentenced to 44 years' imprisonment on June 3. While Clark expressed great remorse at his sentencing, he offered no explanation for the attack and no motive was given.

Clark is serving his sentence at the Cheshire Correctional Institution as inmate #371189, and is scheduled for release on September 16, 2053.

See also 

 List of solved missing persons cases
 Bonnie Garland murder case, Yale undergraduate murdered by her boyfriend, a Yale alumnus, during summer break 1977
 Murder of Christian Prince, involving the death of a Yale senior on campus in 1991
 Murder of Suzanne Jovin, involving the death of a Yale senior off campus in 1998

References

External links 
 

2000s missing person cases
2009 in Connecticut
2009 murders in the United States
Crimes in Connecticut
Deaths by person in Connecticut
Deaths from asphyxiation
Formerly missing people
Incidents of violence against women
Missing person cases in Connecticut
Murdered American students
Sexual assaults in the United States
Yale University
History of women in Connecticut
September 2009 crimes in the United States